Boljun is a village in the municipality of Lupoglav, in Istria County, Croatia. In 2001, the village had 73 residents.
According to the 1921 census, the majority of the population was Italian.

References

Populated places in Istria County